Loren Allred (born September 7, 1989) is an American singer, songwriter and actress. Allred made her Billboard Hot 100 debut with the Platinum-selling "Never Enough" from the musical soundtrack to The Greatest Showman. She appears on Michael Bublé's Love album for a duet of "Help Me Make It Through the Night", and alongside David Foster, as part of his An Intimate Evening PBS concert special and album. Her debut EP Late Bloomer was released on September 24, 2021.

Early life and education
Allred is the eldest daughter born to musician parents. Her mother, Carol Ann Allred, is a classical soprano and voice teacher; her father, Brady R. Allred, was formerly the director of the Pittsburgh Bach Choir and an artistic director and conductor of Salt Lake Choral Artists. She has three younger sisters – Megan, Brennan, and Karin.

After a year of studying musical theatre at Weber State University in Ogden, Utah, she transferred to the Berklee College of Music in Boston, Massachusetts. While in Boston, she uploaded videos to YouTube and was discovered and championed by Ne-Yo, ultimately leading to a record deal with Island Def Jam.

Career
In 2012, Allred was a contestant on season 3 of the American television show The Voice and selected Adam Levine as her coach. Allred was eliminated after the first week of the live playoffs, tying for 13th place.

In 2014, she worked as a playback singer and member of the recording ensemble for a film musical being developed by the Broadway songwriting team of Benj Pasek and Justin Paul. After working on early demos, she was cast as the singing voice of Rebecca Ferguson's character, Jenny Lind, on the project The Greatest Showman. The film soundtrack and song were successful, going Platinum and the soundtrack topping the Billboard albums chart in January 2018. That same month, "Never Enough" (Allred's featured song) reached number 88 on the Hot 100.

Allred's vocal performance of "Never Enough" has received widespread acclaim. Variety said her "incandescent" performance "will sweep you up"; Just Jared called it "Next Level". American Idol alum Kelly Clarkson recorded a cover for the album The Greatest Showman: Reimagined and praised Allred on Twitter for her performance of the song. Other notable artists who have since covered the song include Jennifer Hudson, Nicole Scherzinger, Katharine McPhee, Maria Simorangkir, Jona Viray and Morissette. "Never Enough" has inspired thousands of covers on singing competition shows and across social media.

In early 2019, Allred joined Michael Bublé's Love album for a duet of "Help Me Make it Through the Night." Bublé discovered Allred while watching The Greatest Showman and released a behind the scenes recording of their duet. Bublé noted that Allred has "the most beautiful voice and control".

Allred joined Andrea Bocelli for selected performances on his 2021 USA Tour. In promoting the tour, he said: "If an artist wants to move the listener, he or she must have something intense and convincing to tell through the singing. This something comes from experiences and insight: it is the inner wealth that you can acquire by living. Loren Allred is a perfect example of this: her richly nuanced voice, her expressiveness, and her powers of communication describe and celebrate the beauty she has managed to cultivate within herself. A versatile musician raised in the arts, I remember how pleasantly surprised I was when we sang together for the first time in Saudi Arabia. I am delighted to soon be able to return to the stage with Loren, in that great country that is her homeland and my adoptive homeland."

In 2022, Allred auditioned for the 15th series of Britain's Got Talent, performing "Never Enough". Simon Cowell said: "You sang one of the biggest songs of all time. Why didn't you get that big deal after the song?" She responded:

She received the Golden Buzzer from Amanda Holden, sending her through to the semifinals. She won her semifinal on 2 June and competed in the final, finishing in ninth place.

On January 27, 2023, the “World of Color – One” for Disney 100 debuted at Disneyland featuring the new original song “Start a Wave” featuring Loren Allred and written by Grammy-nominated artist Cody Fry. This is the is the first ever Disneyland Resort nighttime spectacular to feature Walt Disney Animation Studios, Pixar Animation Studios, Marvel’s ‘The Avengers,’ and Star Wars in one show.

Discography

Soundtrack albums

Songs performed on The Voice
 "You Know I'm No Good"
 "All Around the World"
 "Need You Now"
 "When Love Takes Over"

Single

As featured artist

Other charted and certified songs

Guest appearances

Notes

References

External links
 

1989 births
American women singer-songwriters
The Voice (franchise) contestants
Living people
Berklee College of Music alumni
21st-century American women singers
21st-century American singers